Jõeküla may refer to several places in Estonia:

Jõeküla, Hiiu County, village in Käina Parish, Hiiu County
Jõeküla, Järva County, village in Koeru Parish, Järva County
Jõeküla, Rapla County, village in Käru Parish, Rapla County
Jõeküla, Viljandi County, village in Viiratsi Parish, Viljandi County